The PHD Chamber of Commerce and Industry (PHDCCI) - Rajasthan is a trade and industry body of Rajasthan state in India. It is a non-government, not-for-profit industry-led and industry-managed organization, which claims to play a role in industrial development processes. PHDCCI has a membership of over 120 industries and entrepreneurs from the private and public sectors.  It is authorized by the Government of India to issue Certificates of Origin for the products of exports and to issue recommendations for visas. PHDCCI has a presence in Rajasthan in the areas of trade, industry, mining and tourism. It is headquartered in the city of Jaipur and has members from all over Rajasthan.

PHDCCI claims to work with the government  on policy issues through a range of specialized services and national linkages.  It claims to provide a platform for sectoral consensus building and networking, to have an emphasis on projecting a positive image of business, and to assist industry to identify and execute corporate citizenship programmes.

Executive committee 
The executives are as follows: (names are not in a specific order)
 Dr Jayshree Periwal (Chairperson - PHDCCI Rajasthan) 
 Mr. Rash Behari Rungta (Co-chairman - PHDCCI Rajasthan)
 Mr. Rajeev Maheshwari (Chairman - Health, Education & Sports Committee)
 Mr. Praveen Gupta (Co-chairman - Health, Education & Sports Committee)
 Mr. Sharad Mishra (Chairman - Hospitality, Handicraft & Tourism Committee)
 Mr. Abhinav Bishnoi (Chairman - Hospitality, Handicraft & Tourism Committee)
 Mr. Akshay Hada (Chairman - Industry, Infrastructure & MSME Committee)
 Mr. Tarun Sharma (Co-chairman - Industry, Infrastructure & MSME Committee)
 Mr. Rishabh Kasliwal (Chairman - Energy & Environment Committee)
 Ms. Sunita Mantri (Co-chairman - Energy & Environment Committee)
 Mr. Prateek Kasliwal (Chairman - Legal & Finance Committee)
 Ms. Nidhi G Agarwal (Co-chairman - Legal & Finance Committee)

Infrastructure 

PHDCCI has possession of total land measuring 15 thousand sq. ft.

PHDCCI's Secretariat, situated on a newly renovated building where it was shifted and started working from 1 January 2014, is situated on a piece of land measuring approx. 2000 sq. ft.

Membership 

PHDCCI at National Level has a direct membership of 1,30,000 direct / indirect membership including industries/entrepreneurs from the private as well as public sectors.

References 

Rajasthan
Economy of Rajasthan
Chambers of commerce in Rajasthan
Ministry of Micro, Small and Medium Enterprises
Non-profit organisations based in India
Organisations based in Jaipur
Organizations established in 1905
1905 establishments in India